"Romance Anónimo" (Anonymous Romance) is a piece for guitar, also known as "Estudio en Mi de Rubira" (Study in E by Rubira), "Spanish Romance", "Romance de España", "Romance de Amor", "Romance of the Guitar", "Romanza" and "Romance d'Amour" among other names.

Its origins and authorship are currently in question. It is suspected of originally being a solo instrumental guitar work, from the 19th century. It has variously been attributed to Antonio Rubira, David del Castillo, Francisco Tárrega, Fernando Sor, Daniel Fortea, Francisco Vicaria l Llobet, Antonio Cano, Vicente Gómez, and Narciso Yepes. The Anónimo (anonymous) part of its name has been incorporated over the years due to this uncertainty. The question of authorship has probably been propagated by three main reasons: the lack of claim by its true author, the desire to avoid paying copyright fees, and the desire of publishing companies to claim the lucrative copyright of this world-famous piece.

The style of the piece is that of the parlour music of the late 19th century in Spain or South America, having a closed three-part form: the first in the minor key and the second being in the major key, with the third being a restatement of the first.

Early recordings
The earliest recording of "Romance" is on a cylinder (from the "Viuda de Aramburo" label) featuring guitarists Luis and Simon Ramírez, made in Madrid sometime between 1897 and 1901. The work in question is titled "Sort-Estudio para Guitarra por S. Ramirez". It is highly likely that the name "Sort" — as it occurs on the cylinders's title — refers to Fernando Sor, as Sor's surname is sometimes also spelled "Sort" or "Sorts". The recording may be heard on the Doremi CD release "Tarrega, His Disciples, and Their Students" (DHR-7996) and online at the UCSB Cylinder Audio Archive.

Possible origins

Early published versions

Antonio Rubira
Guitarist and composer Isaías Sávio (Montevideo, 1900 — São Paulo, 1977) who published the work in 1959 titled "Romance de Amor (Estudo em Mi) Música de Antonio Rovira (Segunda metade do século XIX)" has published information which also cites Antonio Rubira as author (see "Violào e Mestres" Junio, 1966 / São Paulo, Brasil): Sávio gives information that Juan Pargas (who knew Rubira) gave the Estudio de Rovira to the guitarist Juan Valles in 1876 (1878?). Sávio also mentions that the work became popular in Buenos Aires, and began to be published by some, such as Spaniard Pedro Maza, and that the work appears in the method of Pedro Mascaró y Reissig (published in Montevideo in 1919), on page 14, with the title  "Conocido por Estudio de Rovira". 

Publishing company Ricordi of Argentina currently publishes the piece and attributes authorship to Antonio Rubira.

Manuscripts
The earliest manuscripts of the piece documented so far, are from the late 19th century: one attributing authorship to Antonio Rubira; and an unsigned version which shows a note at the bottom stating "Melodia de Sor" (Sor's melody) arguably attributing the piece to Fernando Sor. A noticeable difference between these manuscripts and the famous version of Yepes is the inverted arpeggio. Both manuscripts, though believed to be from the late 19th Century, have not been formally dated, and are not believed to be in the handwriting of the alleged authors, but rather are believed to be copies made by students or musicians (also note that Fernando Sor died in 1839).

The Ukrainian folk song Nich Yaka Misyachna (Beautiful Moonlight) could be a precursor of the piece. Although some correlation can be made between Beethoven's Moonlight Sonata (especially the arpeggio), the Romance guitar piece and the Ukrainian folk song, the latter has enjoyed much success through Eastern Europe and Russia, while being vastly different from the Spanish/Argentine song and its various arrangements. Notably, since European music is largely governed by the same harmonic principles, similarities between unrelated original compositions are not only inevitable, but ubiquitous.

Disproved origins
Narciso Yepes (1927 — 1997) interpreted and is listed as the author of the piece in René Clément's 1952 film Jeux interdits (Forbidden Games). The popularity of the film gave the piece worldwide fame. Yepes currently has the copyright of this composition in Spain although recordings and manuscripts of this song predate 1952. Newer publications show Yepes as the arranger and the piece being of anonymous authorship, or authored by Fernando Sor.

The official statement from Narciso Yepes and the Yepes heirs is that Narciso Yepes, being a young boy, originally composed the piece for his mother when he was about seven years old (c. 1934) and soon thereafter performed it between acts at the Teatro Guerra, in Lorca, Spain. Some time later, he recounts, when he was thirteen years old he attended a performance in Valencia and heard his composition performed by another guitarist, who indicated the authorship as "anonymous". Yepes contends that the melody had been plagiarized (with some changes to the arrangement) by someone who, he assumes, must have attended that first performance.

However, Yepes was born 1927 and cannot be the author of the work, since it was already recorded in 1900 and published before 1925 (possibly 1913) by J.A. MEDINA e HIJO; and in 1919 in the method of Pedro Mascaró y Reissig, etc.

Vicente Gomez (1911–2001) published it and performed it in 1941 in the Hollywood movie Blood and Sand with Tyrone Power and Rita Hayworth, also attributing authorship of the song to himself.

Other arrangements
 Swedish singer Lill Lindfors covered the piece as "Du är den ende" (Eng: "You are the only one") in 1966, with Swedish lyrics by poet Bo Setterlind with an orchestral arrangement by Marcus Österdahl, also included on her 1967 album Du är den ende. Record producer Curt Pettersson asked for a Latin/Mediterranean influenced arrangement and Marcus Österdahl used his Höfner-bassguiter to create a significant sound that created  a ‘shot-gun’ effect for attention.  A long time later, Lill Lindfors heard from Bo Setterlind that his lyrics version was not based on a love affair, but instead aimed at Jesus.
 The Raphael song "Tema de Amor" was performed in the 1968 Argentinian film Digan lo que digan (Let Them Talk) and it used this song as the melody with lyrics.
 The Dutch Duo de Koning recorded the song as ‘Ave Maria klinkt zacht door de nacht’ probably in 1968
 This piece was the melody for the 1970 Françoise Hardy song "San Salvador".
 The first song of Al Bano and Romina Power was a vocal version, titled "Storia di due innamorati" in 1970.
 The Julio Iglesias song "Quiero" from the 1975 album El Amor used this song as the melody, with added lyrics.
 German singer Bernhard Brink performed a vocal version in 1976 (title: "Liebe auf Zeit").
 An electronic version of the piece was used as background music for the 1980 arcade game Phoenix.
 Andy Williams recorded a version titled "Vino de Amor" by Tony Hiller and Nicky Graham on his 1984 album Greatest Love Classics
 Japanese singer Yōko Oginome recorded the song as her 1993 single "Romance".
 German group B-Tribe used a fragment of it on the track "Desesperada" from their 1998 album Sensual Sensual.
 Eddie Vedder played a version as an opening for the Pearl Jam song "Better Man" at an August 18, 2000 concert at the Deer Creek Music Center in Indianapolis, Indiana.
 The Korean drama Autumn in My Heart (2000) used this song in its soundtrack.
 American rock band My Chemical Romance included this piece as the first song on their debut album I Brought You My Bullets, You Brought Me Your Love, released 2002. It is the only instrumental piece released by the band.
 Mike Oldfield used a fragment of the piece in his track "Romance" on his 2005 album Light + Shade.
 The Buck 65 song "The Outskirts" from the 2007 album Situation uses this piece as backing.
 Cantopop singer Eason Chan included this piece on his 2011 album title release, Stranger Under My Skin. It is a bilingual English and Cantonese song with lyrics by Chow Yiu-Fai.
 Lykke Li covered the piece as "Du är den ende" for the Swedish film Tommy in 2014.
 A vocal version including lyrics, which is called Forbidden Games (Jeux Interdits) (sometimes also Romance of Love) was arranged by B. Parker and Marc Lanjean; and has been performed by artists such as Miriam Makeba and Tom Jones
 Similarly titled Finnish translation "Kielletyt leikit" ("Forbidden Games") was one of the signature songs of Carola and the opening track of her debut album. 
 Mireille Mathieu has performed a two vocal versions; one in French (title: "Amour Défendu") and one in German (title: "Walzer der Liebe")
Ginette Reno has also performed a vocal version, titled Forbidden Games.
Los Niños de Sara, Alabina's French gypsy musicians, did a flamenco version called "Romance Anonimo".
Juan Serrano and Leonardo Áñez also did a flamenco version under "Romance Flamenco".

Bibliography
Herrera, Francisco, Enciclopedia de la Guitarra (Spanish), Piles, Editorial de Música / Valencia, 2004.

References

External links

Narciso Yepes speaks on Forbidden Games Romance Narciso Yepes explains his authorship of the Romance
Qué (no) sabemos del Romance ¿Anónimo? by Santiago Porras Álvarez (This web-article by Álvarez is from 27 September 2002 and lacks some information which is given in Francisco Herrera's "Enciclopedia de la Guitarra")
 Public domain music recording
 Free score for Romance at the International Music Score Library Project

Parlor songs
Spanish folk music
Compositions for guitar
Anonymous musical compositions
Lill Lindfors songs
Compositions with a spurious or doubtful attribution
My Chemical Romance
Romance (music)